Charles Glen King (October 22, 1896 – January 23, 1988) was an American biochemist who was a pioneer in the field of nutrition research and who isolated vitamin C at the same time as Albert Szent-Györgyi. A biography of King states that many feel he deserves equal credit with Szent-Györgyi for the discovery of this vitamin.

Early life and education
King was born in Entiat, Washington to Charles Clement King and Mary Jane Bookwalter. He entered Washington State University early, as his local one-room school did not have a twelfth grade. He was a Member of Lambda Chi Alpha. World War I interrupted his college studies, where he served in the 12th Infantry, a machine gun company. He did not receive his B.S. in chemistry until 1918. He immediately departed for the University of Pittsburgh, earning his M.S. in 1920 and Ph.D. in 1923. From the outset of his graduate studies, the nascent field of vitamins interested him. He remained in Pittsburgh as a professor until 1942 when he left to become the first scientific director of the Nutrition Foundation, Inc., which worked to promote scientific and public health research, both in the U.S. and internationally.

Career
King's contribution to the science of nutrition revolves around his isolation of vitamin C in 1931-1932 by studying the antiscorbic activities of guinea pigs with preparations from lemon juice. Albert Szent-Györgyi was conducting similar research at the University of Szeged in Hungary, focusing on hexuronic acid. The chemical identity of King's active substance was almost identical to Szent-Györgyi's hexuronic acid, but the research of S.S. Silva had declared the hexuronic acid was not vitamin C. However, within two weeks of each other in the spring of 1932, King first, and then Szent-Györgyi, published articles declaring that vitamin C and hexuronic acid were indeed the same compound. Szent-Györgyi would later win a Nobel Prize for his part in the discovery, and controversy remains over whether both men deserve equal credit. King later established the important functional role of vitamin B, and throughout his 40-year research career made many significant contributions in the areas of fats, enzymes and vitamins. King  authored over 200 articles on good nutritional practices and the positive effects of vitamins.

Apart from his work with the Nutrition Foundation, King's public service activities involved creation of the USDA's Plant, Soil, and Nutrition Laboratory in Ithaca, New York. He helped establish the Food and Nutrition Board, dealing with food and nutrition problems in military and civilian populations, beginning in World War II and continuing through 1970. He also helped create the Food Protection Committee, the Recommended Dietary Allowances, the Protein Advisory Group, and the International Union of Nutritional Sciences. He also served on the advisory council to the National Institute of Arthritis and Metabolic Diseases. King officially retired from the Nutrition Foundation in 1963, only to begin a second career as Associate Director of the Institute of Nutrition Sciences and a consultant to the Rockefeller Foundation.

References

External links
US National Library of Medicine Collection of Charles Glen King's papers and biography. Accessed January 2007
 Nobel Prize website The Nobel Prize and the Discovery of Vitamins by Kenneth J. Carpenter, June 22, 2004 see Section on Szent-Györgyi and Vitamin C. Accessed January 2007
 Charles Glen King, 1896 – 1988 A Biographical Memoir by John E Halver and Nevins Scrimshaw, National Academy Of Sciences Biographical Memoirs, Volume 88, Published 2006 (pdf) Accessed January 2007
 

1896 births
1988 deaths
American biochemists
University of Pittsburgh alumni
Washington State University alumni
People from Chelan County, Washington
Vitamin researchers